The Dudváh (also: Horný Dudváh) is a lowland river in western Slovakia. Its source is located in the Čachtice Little Carpathians, and it mostly runs in parallel to the Váh river. It flows into the Váh near the village of Siladice. Its average discharge flow is 1.3 m³/s near Siladice. Its former lower course, the Dolný Dudváh ("lower Dudváh"), branches off close to Siladice and flows towards the south. Near the town Čierna Voda, the Dolný Dudváh flows into the river Čierna voda, which in turn flows into the Little Danube.

References 

Rivers of Slovakia